Raşit is a Turkish given name for males. People named Raşit include:

 Raşit Çetiner, Turkish football coach
 Raşit Meredow, Turkmenistan politician
 Raşit Pertev, Secretary of the International Fund for Agricultural Development
 Raşit Öztaş, Turkish athlete

See also
 Rashit

Turkish masculine given names